In algebra, the Hausdorff completion  of a group G with filtration  is the inverse limit  of the discrete group .  A basic example is a profinite completion.  The image of the canonical map  is a Hausdorff topological group and its kernel is the intersection of all : i.e., the closure of the identity element.  The canonical homomorphism  is an isomorphism, where  is a graded module associated to the filtration.

The concept is named after Felix Hausdorff.

References 
Nicolas Bourbaki, Commutative algebra

Commutative algebra